Justice Is Done is a 1950 French drama film directed by André Cayatte. It tackles the subject of euthanasia by depicting a court case in which a woman is tried for killing her terminally ill employer at his request. It won the Golden Lion at the Venice Film Festival.

Plot
Elsa Lundenstein is accused of having murdered her lover. The jury discusses the case vividly. All members are somehow prejudiced because of personal life experience and subsequently each member reads something different into the presented facts.

Cast
 Michel Auclair as Serge Cremer
 Antoine Balpêtré as Le président du tribunal (as Balpétré)
 Raymond Bussières as Félix Noblet, le 5ème juré
 Jacques Castelot as Gilbert de Montesson, le 1er juré
 Jean Debucourt as Michel Caudron, le 7ème juré (as Jean Debucourt Sociétaire de la Comédie Française)
 Jean-Pierre Grenier as Jean-Luc Flavier, le 3ème juré (as J.P. Grenier)
 Claude Nollier as Elsa Lundenstein (as Claude Nollier de la Comédie Française)
 Marcel Pérès as Évariste Malingré, le 2ème juré (as Marcel Perès)
 Noël Roquevert as Théodore Andrieux, le 6ème juré
 Valentine Tessier as Marceline Micoulin, le 4ème juré
 Jean d'Yd as Le père supérieur
 Agnès Delahaie as Nicole Vaudrémont
 Cécile Didier as Mademoiselle Popélier, l'hôtelière
 Juliette Faber as Danièle Andrieux
 Anouk Ferjac as Denise
 Dita Parlo as Elisabeth

Awards
The film is unique in that it won both the Golden Bear and the Golden Lion.

Wins
 1st Berlin International Film Festival - Golden Bear (Thrillers and Adventures)
 Venice Film Festival - Golden Lion

References

External links

 

1950 films
1950 drama films
1950s French-language films
Films directed by André Cayatte
Golden Lion winners
Golden Bear winners
French drama films
French black-and-white films
1950s French films